Trubatsa virginiae is a species of sea snail, a marine gastropod mollusk in the family Muricidae, the murex snails or rock snails.

Distribution
This marine species occurs off New Caledonia.

References

 Houart, R. (1986). Mollusca Gastropoda: Noteworthy Muricidae from the Pacific Ocean, with description of seven new species. in: Forest, J. (Ed.) Résultats des Campagnes MUSORSTOM I et II Philippines (1976, 1980). Tome 2. Mémoires du Muséum national d'Histoire naturelle. Série A, Zoologie. 133: 427-455.
 Houart, R, Buge, B. & Zuccon, D. (2021). A taxonomic update of the Typhinae (Gastropoda: Muricidae) with a review of New Caledonia species and the description of new species from New Caledonia, the South China Sea and Western Australia. Journal of Conchology. 44(2): 103–147.

virginiae
Gastropods described in 1986